A lighthouse is a tower aiding marine navigation.

Light House, Lighthouse, or The Lighthouse may also refer to:

Art and architecture

Actual lighthouses

 Lighthouse, Chennai, India

Buildings called "Light House" or "Lighthouse"
 Light House (Aarhus), a skyscraper under construction in Aarhus, Denmark
 Light House Cinema, Dublin 1988–present
 Light House Media Centre Wolverhampton, includes a cinema
 Light House Melbourne, residential skyscraper
 Lighthouse Cinema (disambiguation), multiple uses
 The Lighthouse (Glasgow), a museum of architecture and design in Glasgow, Scotland
 Lighthouse (Poole), an arts centre and cinema in Poole, Dorset, England
 The Lighthouse, Colombo, a large bungalow (mansion) in Colombo, Sri Lanka
 Light House (London), award-winning house in Notting Hill, London, England

Film 
 Light House (1976 film), an Indian Malayalam film
 Lighthouse (film), a 1999 British horror film
 The Lighthouse (1998 film) (El faro), an Argentine and Spanish drama
 The Lighthouse (2016 film), a 2016 film based on the 1801 Smalls Lighthouse incident
 The Lighthouse (2019 film), an American-Canadian black and white fantasy horror film

Literature
(Alphabetical by author's surname)
 The Lighthouse (James novel), a 2005 novel by P. D. James
 The Lighthouse Trilogy, a set of young-adult novels by Adrian McKinty
 Light House: A Trifle (2000), a novel by William Monahan
 The Lighthouse (Moore novel), a 2012 novel by Alison Moore
 Lighthouse (1975), a non-fiction book by Tony Parker
 "The Light-House", the unfinished final work of Edgar Allan Poe
 Lighthouse (novel), a 1972 novel by Eugenia Price

Music
 Lighthouse (band), a Canadian rock group
 The Lighthouse (opera), a 1980 opera by Peter Maxwell Davies

Albums 
 Light House (album), a 1986 album by Kim Carnes
 The Lighthouse (Amity Dry album), 2003
 The Lighthouse (Ana da Silva album), 2005
 The Lighthouse (Red Flag album), 1994
 Lighthouse (David Crosby album), 2016 
 Lighthouse (iamthemorning album), 2016
 Lighthouse (Loudspeakers album),  2015
 Lighthouse EP, an EP by The Waifs, or the title song

Songs 
 "Lighthouse" (Westlife song), 2011
 "Lighthouse" (Lucy Spraggan song), 2013
 "Lighthouse" (G.R.L. song), 2015
 "Lighthouse" (Nina Kraljić song), 2016
 "Lighthouse" (Hearts & Colors song), 2016
 "Lighthouse" (Ookay and Fox Stevenson song), 2017
 "Lighthouse", by Audio Adrenaline from Some Kind of Zombie, 1997

Television
 "Lighthouse" (Lost), a 2010 episode of Lost
 "The Lighthouse" (Haven), a 2013 episode and season four finale of Haven
 "The Lighthouse" (How I Met Your Mother), a 2013 episode of How I Met Your Mother
 The Lighthouse, the apparent last refuge of humanity in season 5 episodes of Agents of S.H.I.E.L.D.

Other arts, entertainment and games 
Lighthouse, named used for the State Theatre Company of South Australia from 1982 to 1983
 The Lighthouse (Sapphire & Steel), a 2005 audio drama based on the British TV series Sapphire & Steel
 Lighthouse: The Dark Being, a 1996 computer game
 Lighthouse (dominoes), a double tile in dominoes with no matching tile in the same hand

Businesses and organizations
 Light House Media Centre, a nonprofit art house cinema, gallery and media hub, Wolverhampton, England
 Lighthouse Café, a nightclub in Hermosa Beach, California, U.S.
 Lighthouse Design, a former software company (1989–1996), creator of the Lighthouse Application Suite
 Lighthouse Interactive, a Dutch video games publisher
 Lighthouse International, a New York City-based charitable organization for the visually impaired
 Lighthouse: Center for Human Trafficking Victims
 Lighthouse Wien, a shelter for homeless drug addicts in Vienna, directed by Christian Michelides

Lighthouse organizations for the blind
 LightHouse for the Blind and Visually Impaired, San Francisco-based, the oldest of its kind
 Lighthouse Guild, NYC based
 Columbia Lighthouse for the Blind, regional, based in Washington DC 
 Chicago Lighthouse, regional
 The Lighthouse of Houston, regional

Technology and engineering
 Google Lighthouse, a tool for improving the quality of web pages
 Lighthouse, a type of tracking system used for virtual reality

See also
 :Category:Lighthouses